John Middendorf (born April 13, 1959, in New York City) is a big wall climber and designer of climbing equipment.

In the 1980s, he climbed the hardest walls of Yosemite (including El Capitan and Half Dome), and in 1992 he climbed the largest rock wall in the world, Great Trango Tower. Also in the late 1980s and early 1990s, he pioneered numerous difficult big wall routes in Zion National Park. He is also a renowned portaledge designer and writer.

Great Trango new route 
He achieved worldwide recognition in the climbing world in 1992 when he climbed the East Face of Great Trango Tower (6286 m a.s.l.) in Karakoram, Pakistan, with Xaver Bongard. As a lightweight, two man team, they were the first to climb the largest rock face involving big wall climbing of Great Trango Tower to its summit and make it down alive. (The East Face of Great Trango was climbed in 1984 via neighbor route, Norwegian Pillar, by the team of the finest Norwegian climbers, but the summiters died on the descent; the next two ascents of this route did not continue to the true top of the wall, the East Summit of Great Trango Tower.)

The Grand Voyage ascends the 1350 metre vertical and overhanging rock wall of Great Trango to the East Summit of Great Trango Tower at 6231 metres. Over 2000 metres of climbing is involved from the Dungee Glacier.  Along with the Norwegian Pillar on the same face, the routes have been noted as "perhaps the hardest big-wall climbs in the world" (see Trango Towers). The 1992 new route required 15 days and nights to climb and three days to descend, using portaledges designed and constructed by Middendorf in his outdoor equipment company (A5 Adventures, Inc.)

Equipment maker 
Middendorf, a Stanford-trained mechanical engineer, founded a company, A5 Adventures Inc., in 1986 to design and manufacture portaledges. A portaledge failure during a climb of Half Dome nearly led to the death of Middendorf and his companions Steve Bosque and Mike Corbett, and Middendorf became interested in better designs. A5 portaledges were made of highly weatherproof fabrics and were engineered to be structurally strong and stable; they were the first ones that could withstand the severe weather of high alpine regions, including the Himalayas and Karakoram. A5 went on to design and manufacture a variety of big-wall climbing gear, including aiders, slings, haul bags and packs, climbing protection hardware, and other items. A5 Adventures Inc. was acquired by The North Face in 1997, where he worked as a Senior Product Manager for several years and continued manufacturing the equipment under its "A5" brand. The designs were later transferred to Black Diamond, including his well-known “Cliff Cabana” design, first made in 1995.

In 2017, while employed as a high school math, science, and robotics teacher in the Tasmanian school system, he began a three-year redesign of portaledges, cumulating in the D4 Delta2p (2-person)design and the D4 Delta3p (3-person) design, the first “foot-out” portaledge designs. He also built a number of other designs, including the D4 Trapezium, a small compact shelter which he personally tested in high winds and extreme weather in the Tasmania forests as part of protests against the denuding of Tasmanian temperate rainforests. After building over a hundred portaledges and networking with the world’s best bigwall climbers, he considered the design “mature”, and made all his design work open source, with all construction and engineering details available on his website, Bigwalls.net.

References

External links
 "  John Middendorf, Great Trango Tower, East Face, Swiss-American Expedition American Alpine Journal (AAJ), 1993, pp. 260–263, with further photographs on pp. 257, 264 (Retrieved 14 April 2010)
 www.bigwalls.net, John Middendorf's Big Walls Website with many articles by him (Retrieved 14 April 2010)
 bigwallgear.com, John Middendorf’s historical climbing tools and technique articles

1959 births
Living people
20th-century American inventors
21st-century American inventors
American mountain climbers
American rock climbers
Sportspeople from New York City